The 2014 NBL Canada All-Star Game was the third edition of the National Basketball League of Canada All-Star Game, an exhibition basketball game played on April 20, 2014 in Charlottetown, Prince Edward Island. It was played between the top players from both of the league's divisions, the Central and Atlantic, the second time the event was in such a format. The All-Star Game took place in Eastlink Centre, the home court of the Island Storm. The players who competed were decided by votes from NBL coaches. Antonio Ballard, who played with the Storm, was named Most Valuable Player after putting up 39 points, 10 rebounds, and 6 assists.

Results
Each team had to feature at least three Canadian players, and each team was represented by a minimum of one player. They both had five starters and five reserves. Justin Tubbs and Trayvon Lathan were nominated to compete, but were playing overseas at the same time. Stanley Robinson of the Moncton Miracles was facing an injury and failed to appear.

References

External links 
 2014–15 NBL Postseason Media Guide

All